Claudia Tavel Antelo (born March 11, 1989) is a Bolivian beauty pageant titleholder and model who was crowned Miss Bolivia 2013 and represented her country at Miss Universe 2014.

Early life
Tavel lived in the neighborhood of Santa Cruz Pan and she studied at the Bolivian Argentine School and for six years she joined the ballet Santa Cruz and interested in folklore.

Pageantry

Miss Bolivia 2013
Claudia Tavel Antelo was crowned Miss Bolivia Universe 2014 during the gala finals of the Miss Bolivia 2013 pageant held at the Siriono Hall of Fexpo on June 13.

Reina Hispanoamericana 2013
Tavel was chosen as Bolivian representative at Reina Hispanoamericana 2013 in Santa Cruz, Bolivia.

Miss Universe 2014
Tavel competed at Miss Universe 2014 but Unplaced.

References

Miss Universe 2014 contestants
1989 births
Living people
People from Santa Cruz de la Sierra
Bolivian beauty pageant winners
Bolivian female models